Bugaba District is a district (distrito) of Chiriquí Province in Panama. The population according to the 2000 census was 68,570. The district covers a total area of 884 km². The capital lies at the city of La Concepción.

Administrative divisions
Bugaba District is divided administratively into the following corregimientos:

La Concepción (capital)
Aserrío de Gariché
Bugaba
Gómez
La Estrella
San Andrés
Santa Marta
Santa Rosa
Santo Domingo
Solano
Sortová
El Bongo

References

Districts of Panama
Chiriquí Province